Socrates Drank the Conium, known also as Socrates, is a Greek rock band that formed in 1969 and achieved success in the 1970s. Influenced by heavy blues and rock bands like The Jimi Hendrix Experience and Cream, the band melded the unorthodox time signatures and orchestration of progressive rock and the intensity of blues and hard rock music, creating a unique sound that distinguished them from other Greek rock acts of that period. Outside Greece, Socrates is best known for Phos, their 1976 landmark collaboration album with Vangelis.

The group has gone through many lineup changes, but the two core members remained: guitarist Yannis Spathas and bassist/singer Antonis Tourkogiorgis. Spathas died in 2019, aged 68. Nikos Antipas died on January 31, 2022, from complications related to stroke, aged 68.

History
Socrates began its career in the clubs of Athens, most prominently the popular Kyttaro.  They were present at a number of other locations in and around Victoria Square in Athens.  In addition to performing originals, Socrates often covered Jimi Hendrix songs, none of which were featured on any studio releases; a thirteen-minute cover of "(I Can't Get No) Satisfaction" by the Rolling Stones, however, found its way onto their 1972 album Taste of Conium.

Yannis Spathas favored two sunburst Fender Stratocasters, a Candy Apple Red Roland GR-505 guitar synthesizer, a black Gibson Les Paul Custom and a cherry sunburst Les Paul Standard. Antonis Tourkogiorgis played a mid-1970s natural ash-bodied Fender Jazz Bass, a Warwick Corvette Double Buck bass and sang, while several drummers were used throughout the live shows and recording sessions.

In 1975, Socrates went through a change in stylistic direction with Phos, which featured Vangelis' production and  contributions on many tracks. Phos was mostly reworkings of older songs by Socrates. Both LPs On the Wings and Phos were issued in the USA via Neil Kempfer-Stocker's Prog imprint Cosmos.

In 2002, Socrates reunited in an extended form (featuring keyboards and a second singer) to do several shows around Greece.  This lineup remains active.

Yannis Spathas died on 6 July 2019, aged 68.

Band members
Lineup (2002–2010)
Antonis Tourkogiorgis – lead vocals, bass 
Makis Gioulis – drums
Asterios Papastamatakis – keyboards
Markella Panayiotou – backing vocals (reunion 1999 – 2009)

Past members
Yannis Spathas – lead guitar (died on 6 July 2019)
Elias Boukouvalas – drums
Kostas "Gus" Doukakis – guitar 
George Trantalidis – drums 
Nikos Antypas – drums
Costas Karamitros – drums
Costas Triantaphyllou – guitar
Yiorgos Zikoyiannis – bass
Pavlos Alexiou – keyboards
Leonidas Alachadamis – drums

Timeline

Discography
Albums
Socrates Drank the Conium – 1971
Taste of Conium – 1972
On the Wings – 1973
Phos – 1976
Waiting for Something – 1980
Breaking Through – 1981
Plaza – 1983
Live in Concert – 1999

Singles
"My Only Fellow / Friends Blues" – 1971
"Live in the Country" – 1972
"Starvation / Queen of the Universe" – 1976
"Justice (Live)" – 1999

Compilations
From Persons to Socrates Drank the Conium – The Singles Collection – 1996
The Complete Polydor Years – 1997
The Original Singles – 2005

VA
Live at Kyttaro – 1971

References

External links

Greek rock music groups
Musical groups established in 1969
Musical groups from Athens
1969 establishments in Greece